The Oakwood Memorial Park Cemetery is located at 22601 Lassen Street, Chatsworth, Los Angeles, California. It is the resting place for several movie stars such as Fred Astaire, Ginger Rogers, Gloria Grahame, and Stephen Boyd.

History and description
Oakwood Memorial Park is located in the San Fernando Valley, surrounded by rocky hills that have served as a backdrop for many a film setting. It has been used as a cemetery since 1924, and there was a  Native American graveyard next to the cemetery before a fire destroyed the old wooden crosses that marked the site. The Old Stagecoach Trail passed beside it. The historic Chatsworth Community Church is located within the cemetery grounds.

Notable burials
Notables buried here include:

 Adele Astaire (1897–1981), actress, dancer
 Fred Astaire (1899–1987), actor, singer, dancer
 Dehl Berti (1921–1991), actor
 Derya Arbaş Berti (1968–2003), actress
 Stephen Boyd (1928–1977), actor
 Scott Bradley (1891-1977), composer
 Bob Crane (1928-1978), actor (former burial location)
 Grace Cunard (1893–1967), actress, screenwriter, director
 Lloyd G. Davies, Los Angeles City Council member, 1943–51
 Frank Kelly Freas (1922–2005), illustrator
 Gloria Grahame (1923–1981), actress
 Raymond Greenleaf (1892–1963), actor
 Russell Hayden (1912–1981), actor
 Jack Ingram (1902–1969), actor
 Al Jennings (1863–1961), lawyer, outlaw, actor
 Adele Jergens (1917–2002), actress
 Milton Kibbee (1896–1970), actor
 Dorothy Mackaye (1899–1940), actress
 Montie Montana (1910–1998), cowboy
 Freddie Perren (1943–2004), songwriter, record producer
 Floyd Roberts (1900–1939), Indianapolis 500 winner
 Ginger Rogers (1911–1995), actress, singer, dancer
 Robert Sampson (1933–2020), actor
 Mark Schaeffer (1948–2022), baseball player
 Robert F. Simon (1908–1992), actor
 Ted Snyder (1881–1965), composer
 Ken Spears (1938–2020), animator
 Ken Terrell (1904–1966), actor
 Henry Victor (1892–1945), actor
 Gregory Walcott (1928–2015), actor
 Nydia Westman (1902–1970), actress
 Dallas Willard (1935–2013), Christian philosopher
 Walter Tetley (1915-1975), voice actor Felix the cat,(1919-1959)

See also
 List of United States cemeteries

References

External links
 

Cemeteries in Los Angeles
Chatsworth, Los Angeles
1924 establishments in California